Through the Looking Glass is the eleventh studio album (though counted as the 12th album overall — see Toto XIV)  by the American band Toto. It was released in 2002, three years after their last studio release, Mindfields. The album consists of cover versions of songs that had inspired the band.

Reception

AllMusic noted that Toto made no attempt to rework the songs they covered for the album, and concluded that "while it's nice to know that the band has good taste in other people's music, that doesn't explain why anyone needs to hear them copy that music when the originals are so readily available."

Track listing

Personnel 
Toto
Bobby Kimball: lead vocals , backing vocals , loops 
Steve Lukather: guitars , lead vocals , backing vocals , keyboards , dobro , loops 
David Paich: keyboards , lead vocals , backing vocals , piano , Moog bass , Wurlitzer , loops 
Mike Porcaro: bass guitar , backing vocals , loops 
Simon Phillips: drums , loops , tambourine , backing vocals , keyboards 
Additional Musicians
Lenny Castro: timbales , percussion , congas , tambourine 
Brandon Fields: tenor saxophone , alto saxophone , soprano saxophone 
Walt Fowler: trumpet , flugelhorn 
Ellis Hall: vocals 
James Ingram: backing vocals and ad-libs 
Tippa Irie: DJ 
Davey Johnstone: backing vocals 
Monet: backing vocals , ad-libs 
Nigel Olsson: backing vocals 
Steve Porcaro: synthesizer programming , synthesizer and sound effects

Production
Arranged and Produced by Toto
Engineered by Simon Phillips
Assistant Engineer: John Jessel 
Tracks #1-5 & 7-11 mixed by Steve MacMillan
Track #6 mixed by Simon Phillips
Digital Editing by Louie Teran
Mastered by Stephen Marcussen
Edited and Mastered at Marcussen Mastering (Hollywood, CA).
Project Coordination: Anita Heilig
Art Direction and Design: Brian Peterson
Creative Director: Doug Brown
Photography: Resig & Taylor
Management: The Fitzgerald Hartley Co.

Singles
 Could You Be Loved / House of the Rising Sun

References

2002 albums
Toto (band) albums
Covers albums